The Ora River is a river of West Nile, Northern Uganda. It is a tributary of the Albert Nile.
It is located in the north-west of Uganda.

Rivers of Uganda